Arnaldo Leite Pinto Garcia (born 1950) is a Brazilian mathematician working on algebraic geometry and coding theory. He is a titular researcher at the IMPA.

Garcia is a titular member of the Brazilian Academy of Sciences and has received Brazil's National Order of Scientific Merit.

He obtained his Ph.D. at the IMPA in 1980 under the guidance of Karl-Otto Stöhr.

Selected writings
A tower of Artin-Schreier extensions of function fields attaining the Drinfeld-Vladut bound
On the asymptotic behaviour of some towers of function fields over finite fields
On subfields of the Hermitian function field
On maximal curves

References

Brazilian mathematicians
Instituto Nacional de Matemática Pura e Aplicada alumni
Instituto Nacional de Matemática Pura e Aplicada researchers
Members of the Brazilian Academy of Sciences
Algebraic geometers
1950 births
Living people